The North Adams Museum of History and Science is located on State Street in North Adams, Massachusetts as part of Western Gateway Heritage State Park. The building it inhabits was originally built in 1880 as a coal distribution center. The museum, however, was established by the North Adams Historical Society in 1988.

The first floor of the museum contains exhibits on the Industrial Revolution, and its effects on what became an industrial center during the nineteenth and early twentieth centuries. This exhibit displays machine parts and goods of some of the major manufacturing companies in the town during this era: Hunter Machine Company, Arnold Printworks and Sprague Electric. This floor also contains artifacts that depict farming, education, and home life during this era. One can find a children’s room, North Adams school paraphernalia, city uniforms, and household objects.

The second floor is particularly notable for its Freight Yard exhibit. A moving train set has been constructed to model the town of North Adams and its train system. In this room there are also exhibits on immigration, which highlights French, Lebanese, Welsh, Italian, Jewish, Irish, and Chinese immigration to the area; religion, mainly by showing the churches that have been built in North Adams; and ballooning. In an adjacent room exist displays on flora and fauna, geography (containing a topographical map of this area of the Berkshires), and a kids’ room relating to flora and fauna of the area.

Finally, the third floor is centered on political and military history of the area. It contains a voting machine from the nineteenth century, information on past mayors of North Adams, information on military heroes of the area, and Native American artifacts of those who inhabited the area before the settlers. There is also a side room dedicated to Fort Massachusetts, an English fort in North Adams during the French and Indian War. Finally, there is also a blacklight gallery that is used as a display of the Solar System.

The museum’s hours are Saturday 10AM-4PM and Sunday 1-4PM November through April, and Thursday through Saturday 10AM-4PM and Sunday 1-4PM May through October. The museum is closed on holidays.

References

External links
 North Adams Museum of History and Science, North Adams Historical Society

Museums in Berkshire County, Massachusetts
Buildings and structures in North Adams, Massachusetts
History museums in Massachusetts
Industry museums in Massachusetts